Itbayat, officially the Municipality of Itbayat,, is a 5th class municipality in the province of Batanes, Philippines. According to the 2020 census, it has a population of 3,128 people.

In addition to the main island of Itbayat which is the largest in Batanes, the municipality includes the rest of the province's northern islands, all small and mostly uninhabited. These islands are, from south to north: Di'nem Island, Siayan, Misanga, Ah'li, and Mavulis Island, the northernmost island of the Philippine archipelago.

History
While the church and civil government were already established in Batan Island in 1783, it was only in 1855 that civil authority was officially established and the mission canonically founded in Itbayat. A mere settlement during the Spanish colonial period, it became a municipal district when the Americans organized the province in 1909. However, in 1935, it became a municipality.

On September 14, 2016, Typhoon Meranti (Ferdie) made landfall on Itbayat while at peak intensity, as a Category 5-equivalent super typhoon, with the center of the eye passing directly over the island. During landfall, the storm's powerful winds caused extensive damage and knocked out the island's communications systems.

On July 27, 2019, a series of destructive earthquakes, largest of them measured 5.9 in the Richter scale, caused severe damage in the town. Nine people died as a result, and an additional sixty were injured.

Geography

According to the Philippine Statistics Authority, the municipality has a land area of  constituting  

of the total area of Batanes.

Islands, islets, atolls and outcrops
The entire municipality of Itbayat constitutes several islands, islets, atolls and outcrops.

Itbayat Island, the largest of the group is where the administrative center is located.
 Di'nem Island is located southeast of Itbayat island and part of the Ibayat group of islands.
 Mavulis Island, located between the northernmost Y'Ami and Itbayat island, is the second largest among the group. Nearby is Siayan island and Maysanga islet.
 Maysanga islet lies next and south of Mavulis island and north of Siayan island and part of the Ibayat group of islands.
Siayan Island is located south of Mavulis island and part of the Ibayat group of islands under the jurisdiction of the municipality of Itbayat.
 North Island lies nearby Y'ami island and is part of the Ibayat group of islands. At least two outcrops can be found nearby.
 Y'Ami Island, the northernmost of the Itbayat group under the jurisdiction of the municipality of Itbayat. It is the northernmost point of the Philippines and the last territorial island bordering Taiwan.

Barangays
Itbayat is politically subdivided into five barangays. Each barangay is headed by a barangay captain and a barangay council, whose members are called barangay councilors. All are elected every three years.

Climate
Itbayat experiences cooler temperatures from December to February due to its northerly location.

Demographics

In the 2020 census, Itbayat had a population of 3,128.

Economy

Government
Itbayat, belonging to the lone congressional district of the province of Batanes, is governed by a mayor designated as its local chief executive and by a municipal council as its legislative body in accordance with the Local Government Code. The mayor, vice mayor, and the councilors are elected directly by the people through an election which is being held every three years.

Elected officials

Education
The Schools Division of Batanes governs the town's public education system. The division office is a field office of the DepEd in Cagayan Valley region. The office governs the public and private elementary and public and private high schools throughout the municipality.

Tourism

 Siayan Island: the nearest island to the north of Itbayat. It has beaches accessible by a one-hour ride by motorboat from Itbayat (depending on sea condition).
 Di'nem Island: this volcanic island located east of Itbayat. It features boulder beaches with towering cliffs used for mountain climbing.
 Rapang Cliff: A natural park with a ringing mushroom-like rock. It is believed to have been used by the ancient settlers to call a meeting.
 Mount Riposed: One of the two major elevations (aside from Karaboboan) that have been the foundation of Itbayat Island. Situated in the south-eastern part of Itbayat has an elevation of  that offers views of the island.
 Mount Karaboboan (Mount Santa Rosa): The other extinct volcano of Itbayat Island is in the island's northern half. Near the  mountain is a settlement of the early settlers of Itbayat near Barangay Santa Rosa.
 Torongan Cave: The most ancient dwelling place has a burial ground on top. It is believed to be the first landing place of the Austronesians from Taiwan around 2000 BC.
 Nahili Votox: With its own Ijang and boat-shaped burial grounds, it is also an ancient settlement where many broken clay pots have been found. Its Ijang has views of Dinem and Itbayat Island's eastern coast.
 Underground Stream in Kumayasakas: The stream flows down the sea, north-west of Itbayat.
 Itbayat Caves: These caves feature stalagmites and stalactites, and have been given the names Northern Sarokan, Eastern Sarokan, Do'tboran Cave, and Pevangan Cave.
 Agosan Rock: rock formation north of Itbayat which is a breeding site for endangered birds.
 Vernacular houses: A typical vernacular house is composed of three structures: 
 Port Mauyen: An alternative port south of Itbayat with a 14-turn zigzag road.
 Groto: 155 steps up

Infrastructure
Itbayat is served by seaports and an airport.

Transportation to the island town is by boat or by plane direct from the provincial capital of Basco.

Jorge Abad Airport serves as the gateway to the island for STOL planes through Basco airport or other airports from mainland Luzon.

There are small carriers that provide commercial scheduled and non-scheduled flights to Itbayat from Basco Airport. Jorge Abad Airport is served by the following small airline companies:

 Sky Pasada
 NorthSky Air

The town can be reached by sea going vessels that provide transportation for locals and tourists between Itbayat and Basco. The following companies provide daily scheduled voyage between the provincial capital Basco and Itbayat:
 M/B Ocean Spirit
 M/B Itranza
 M/B Veronica

There are no private charterer seagoing boats or larger vessels in the island. Charter flights, however, can be scheduled to and from the island town.

References

External links

 [ Philippine Standard Geographic Code]

Municipalities of Batanes
Island municipalities in the Philippines